The Essential Motörhead is a two-disc compilation album by the band Motörhead. It covers hits from the band's debut album Motörhead (1977) until the 10th album March ör Die (1992).

Track listing

Disc 1

Disc two

Motörhead
 Lemmy – lead vocals, bass
 "Fast" Eddie Clarke – guitars, backing vocals (disc one: tracks 1 – 20, disc two: tracks 1–3)
 Brian Robertson – guitars (disc two: tracks 4–6)
 Phil Campbell – guitars (disc two: tracks 7–18)
 Michael "Würzel" Burston – guitars (disc two: tracks 7–18)
 Phil "Philty Animal" Taylor – drums (disc one: track 1 – 20, disc two: tracks 1–6, 12–15 & 17)
 Pete Gill – drums (disc two: tracks 7–11)

Additional musician
 Tommy Aldridge – drums (disc 2: tracks 16 & 18)

References

Motörhead compilation albums
2007 greatest hits albums
Heavy metal compilation albums